The Trentemøller Chronicles is a compilation album by Danish electronic musician Trentemøller, released on October 1, 2007. The first disc acts as a mix session, mixed by Trentemøller and the second disc contains selected Trentemøller remixes in their full length. The double album is also available on vinyl and as digital download.

The liner notes read:

The Trentemøller Chronicles peaked at #13 on the Danish Albums Chart.

Track listing

Standard edition

Digital download version
 "The Forest" - 5:45
 "Klodsmajor" - 3:13
 Klovn - "McKlaren (Trentemøller Remix)" - 5:18
 "Snowflake (Live Version)" - 7:49
 "Blood in the Streets" - 6:31
 "Moan (Trentemøller Remix)" - 7:25 (featuring Ane Trolle)
 "Kink" - 6:49
 "Gush" - 5:59
 "Physical Fraction" - 7:05
 "Killer Kat" - 7:07
 "Rykketid" - 5:13
 "Always Something Better (Trentemøller Remix)" - 7:57

 Mathias Schaffhäuser - Coincidance (Trentemøller Remix)" - 7:22
 The Knife - "We Share Our Mothers' Health (Trentemøller Remix)" - 7:29
 Filur - "You And I (Trentemøller Free Dub Remix)" - 9:06
 Jokke Ilsøe - "Feeling Good (Trentemøller Remix - Chronicles Edit)" - 6:19
 Sharon Phillips - "Want 2 / Need 2 (Trentemøller Remix)" - 6:02
 Tomboy - "Flamingo (Trentemøller Remix)"  9:05
 Djuma Soundsystem - "Les Djinns (Trentemøller Remix)" - 6:15
 Martinez - "Shadowboxing (Trentemøller Remix)" - 6:14
 Blue Foundation - As I Movedon (Run Jeremy Band's 12 Inch Pleasure Mix)" - 4:43
 Trentemøller - "African People" - 6:43
 Trentemøller - "Prana" - 6:31

Charts

References

Trentemøller albums
2007 compilation albums